On Probation is a 1935 American drama film directed by Charles Hutchison and starring Monte Blue, Lucile Browne and William Bakewell.

Cast
 Monte Blue as Al Murray  
 Lucile Browne as Jane Murray  
 William Bakewell as Bill Coleman  
 Barbara Bedford as Mable Gordon  
 Matthew Betz as Dan  
 Edward LeSaint as Judge  
 Betty Jane Graham as Jane at Age 12  
 Arthur Loft as Benson  
 Henry Roquemore as Lambert  
 Lloyd Ingraham as Horne  
 King Kennedy as Clarence  
 Margaret Fealy as Fagan Woman

References

Bibliography
 Pitts, Michael R. Poverty Row Studios, 1929–1940: An Illustrated History of 55 Independent Film Companies, with a Filmography for Each. McFarland & Company, 2005.

External links
 

1935 films
1935 drama films
American drama films
Films directed by Charles Hutchison
American black-and-white films
1930s English-language films
1930s American films